Jorts is an orange tabby cat that initially rose to fame in December 2021 for a viral Reddit thread discussing workplace attempts to train him that included him being smeared with margarine. A Twitter account personifying Jorts (and his fellow workplace cat Jean) as a supporter of organized labor has since received recognition.

Office events 

Jorts and Jean are two cats that live in an office space. Jorts cannot perform certain daily tasks such as opening doors, whereas Jean is described as a comparatively smart cat who helps Jorts.

To prevent Jorts from being trapped behind doors, staff in the office space purchased a doorstop. Another staff member, alias "Pam," objected to this. Pam then compiled a list of training tasks for Jorts in the office, which was met with disagreement by other staff, who said that Jorts would not learn due to his low intellect. When a member of the office staff asserted that "you can't expect Jean's tortoiseshell smarts from orange cat Jorts," Pam stated that this was "perpetuating ethnic stereotypes by saying orange cats are dumb." Pam reportedly requested racial sensitivity training before agreeing to return to work. "Jorts", "Jean", and "Pam" were stated to be pseudonyms to preserve the anonymity of the workforce. Later, Jorts' Twitter account confirmed that Jorts and Jean were the cats' real names.

The events led to the involvement of human resources management at the workplace. Discussions with human resources led to the discovery that Pam had been applying margarine to Jorts in an attempt to motivate him to groom himself more effectively. These events were anonymously posted in December 2021 to Reddit's "Am I the Asshole" subreddit, resulting in extensive public awareness.

An agreement was ultimately reached to resolve the dispute.

Twitter advocacy 
 
The popularity of the Reddit thread discussing these office events led to the creation of a Twitter account that shares updates about the activities of Jorts (and Jean). As of March 2022, the Twitter account had 170,000 followers.

The Twitter account regularly posts pro-trade union messages, winning praise from cartoonist Tom Tomorrow, Senator Elizabeth Warren, and labor movement figures, including Liz Shuler, Lorena Gonzalez Fletcher, and the United Farm Workers. Jorts' labor advocacy has been compared to Scabby the Rat, the giant inflatable rodents that have been used to draw public attention to strikes for decades. Other messages from the Twitter account promote public investment in education and public health. In addition, the account advocates for inclusive technology and policies, such as the alt attribute used to display text in lieu of an image for screen reader software, and protection of transgender people.

Public requests to create Jorts merchandise were rejected by the Twitter account. Instead, the account has encouraged followers to adopt cats from pet shelters, donate to a strike fund, or customize existing clothing with the phrase "I LIKE JORTS THE CAT".

The Twitter account criticized California Governor Gavin Newsom for not signing AB2183, United Farm Workers-supported legislation that would allow agricultural workers, generally migrant workers, to choose their voting method in labor elections to choose to be represented by a union and to elect union leaders. On September 4, 2022, the White House issued a statement from President Joe Biden, supporting the legislation; Newsom ultimately signed the bill into law on September 28, 2022.

Influence 
In January 2022, critique of Jorts' intelligence and speculative statements by office staff linking his apparent poor life skills to the color of his coat, prompted rejection of the hypothesis that coat colors were causally linked to cat intelligence.

In popular culture 
A mod of the video game Stardew Valley was made featuring Jorts and fellow office cat Jean as non-player characters. In the game both cats attempt to get workers to unionize.

See also 

 Cats and the Internet
 List of individual cats
Wikipedia cats portal

References

External links 

 Reddit threads:
 
 
 

2021 in Internet culture
2022 in Internet culture
Animals on the Internet
Fictional characters introduced in 2021
Individual cats in the United States
Internet memes about cats
Male mammals